The women's +78 kg competition of the 2015 World Judo Championships was held on 29 August 2015.

Results

Finals

Repechage

Pool A

Pool B

Pool C

Pool D

Prize money
The sums listed bring the total prizes awarded to 14,000$ for the individual event.

References

External links
 
 Draw

W79
World Judo Championships Women's Heavyweight
World W79